Tender Melody is a studio album of Sofia Rotaru, recorded at Melodiya in the USSR. The album was widely acclaimed in the countries of the former USSR and the total sales amounted to more than 2 million copies.

Track listing

Languages of performance 
Songs are performed in Russian and Romanian languages.

See also 
 Tender Melody (song)

References

External links 
artvertep
Volodymyr Ivasyuk Official Fan-Club Site

1985 albums
Sofia Rotaru albums